Savonia is a historical province in the east of Finland. It borders Tavastia, Ostrobothnia and Karelia. Currently, Savonia is divided into two provinces: Northern Savonia and Southern Savonia. The largest cities in Savonia by population are Kuopio, Mikkeli, Savonlinna, Varkaus and Iisalmi.

Administration

In the 19th century, Savonia was divided between Kuopio Province and Mikkeli Province. From 1997 to 2010, it lay within the administrative province of Eastern Finland. The provinces have no administrative function today, but survive as ceremonial units. Since 2010, Savonia has been divided between the regions of Northern Savonia and Southern Savonia.

History
The province of Savo represents the original homeland of the Savonians, one of the subgroups that later became assimilated to form the Finns. It was the heartland of the east Finnish or Savonian dialects.

The people of Savonia traditionally pursued slash-and-burn agriculture, which settlers successfully imported into Ostrobothnia and Kainuu, Värmland in southwestern Sweden, and eastern Norway. Savonian settlers also migrated to Finnish Karelia, Ingria (see: Ingrian Finns) and to southern Sweden, parts of northern Sweden, and Norway (see: Forest Finns).

Savonia, which had been a part of Sweden from the late-13th century, was separated from Sweden when Finland was ceded to Russia in September 1809.

Culture
Traditionally, the Savonian people have often been considered as "sneaky". Recent research has shown that this reputation is largely due to misunderstandings caused by Savonians' traditional lack of social directness.

Famous Savonians
Urho Kekkonen
Erkki Liikanen
Spede Pasanen
Jyrki Katainen
Minna Canth
Maria Jotuni
Juice Leskinen

Heraldry
The arms of Savonia are crowned by a count's coronet, though by Finnish tradition this more resembles a Swedish baronial coronet. Blazon: "Sable, a drawn hand bow in and arrow aimed toward dexter chief, or; bow string, arrowhead and feathered tail, argent." The traditional colors of the province are black and gold.

References

Further reading 

 

Historical provinces of Finland
Eastern Finland Province
North Savo
South Savo